Rampal Meghwal is an Indian politician from the Bharatiya Janata Party and a former member of the Rajasthan Legislative Assembly representing the Atru Vidhan Sabha constituency of Rajasthan.

References 

Bharatiya Janata Party politicians from Rajasthan